Pedro de Castro y Figueroa, 1st Duke of la Conquista, 1st Marquess of Gracia Real, KOS, OSJ (December 8, 1678, San Julián de Cela, A Coruña Province, Spain – August 22, 1741, Mexico City) was a Spanish military officer and viceroy of New Spain from August 17, 1740 to August 22, 1741.

In Spain
As a result of successful military action, King Philip V of Spain made Castro- Figueroa y Salazar Alvarado marqués de Gracia Real on October 4, 1729. Charles VII, king of the Two Sicilies (later Charles III of Spain), granted him the title of duque de la Conquista on October 4, 1735. In Spain he was lieutenant colonel of the royal guards of the Infantería Española, then field marshal, then captain general of the armies. He was later lord of the bedchamber to the king and president of the Real Audiencia. He was a knight of the military orders of Santiago and San Gennaro.

As Viceroy of New Spain
He was named viceroy of New Spain by Philip V in 1740 to replace Juan Antonio de Vizarrón y Eguiarreta. The Dutch merchant ship transporting him to New Spain was taken by an English frigate near Puerto Rico, but he was able to launch a boat and, together with some other passengers, avoid being captured. He did, however, lose all of his luggage, including his credentials and the royal orders and instructions, therefore, arriving in San Juan, Puerto Rico without papers. He then made his way to Veracruz, where he arrived on June 30, 1740. From Veracruz he wrote to the archbishop of Mexico, who recognized him as the new viceroy. He made his formal entry into Mexico City on August 17, 1740.

To compensate him for his losses to the English, the Crown increased his salary to the amount then received by the viceroy of Peru.

During his period as viceroy, he worked to improve the mines at Zacatecas by improving the drainage system, supporting the missions in the Philippines, clearing obstructions from the port of Veracruz and deepening the harbor, and paying the costs of the one thousand soldiers sent by Spain to Cuba to protect against the English.

The new viceroy found the colony poorly defended and beset by the French from the north and the English on the Caribbean coasts. He reinforced the garrison of St. Augustine, Florida (recently attacked by the English) by 300 soldiers and provisions.

The English, under Admiral Edward Vernon, had created havoc in the Spanish trade with the Indies, taking Portobelo, Panama in 1739, and laying siege to Cartagena (Colombia), which they did not succeed in taking. Fearing that Veracruz was next, Castro y Figueroa ordered construction of new batteries at San Juan de Ulúa, more supplies, the drafting of a militia, and the raising of a battalion of marines named La Corona. He went personally to Veracruz to supervise the new measures, but he soon came down with hemorrhagic dysentery. He was transported back to Mexico City, where he died August 22, 1741.

After his death
The Audiencia took over the government of the colony pending the arrival of a new viceroy, with its president, Pedro Malo de Villavicencio, serving in an acting capacity until the arrival of Castro de Figueroa's replacement in 1742. Castro y Figueroa was interred in the convent of La Piedad, south of Mexico City.

Additional information

See also
 José de Escandón
 Lorenzo Boturini Bernaducci

Notes

Sources

1678 births
1741 deaths
Viceroys of New Spain
Marquesses of Spain
101
Knights of Santiago
Spanish generals
People from A Coruña (comarca)
Infectious disease deaths in Mexico
Deaths from dysentery